Little Girl in Blue Velvet is a 1978 French drama film written and directed by Alan Bridges and starring Michel Piccoli, Claudia Cardinale and Lara Wendel.

Plot

Cast 
 Michel Piccoli as Conrad Brukner
 Claudia Cardinale as Francesca Modigliani
 Lara Wendel as Laura
 Umberto Orsini as Fabrizio Conti
 Denholm Elliott as Mike
 Marius Goring as Raimondo Casarès
 Alexandra Stewart as Théo Casarès
 Bernard Fresson as Professor Lherbier
 Angharad Rees as Macha
 Christopher Cazenove as "Baby"
 Vernon Dobtcheff as Lamberti

References

External links

English-language French films
French drama films
1978 drama films
1978 films
Films directed by Alan Bridges
1970s English-language films
1970s French films